The 1978 Capital City 400 was a NASCAR Winston Cup Series race that took place on September 10, 1978, at Richmond Fairgrounds (now Richmond Raceway) in Richmond, Virginia.

By 1980, NASCAR had completely stopped tracking the year model of all the vehicles and most teams did not take stock cars to the track under their own power anymore.

Background
In 1953, Richmond International Raceway began hosting the Grand National Series with Lee Petty winning that first race in Richmond.  The original track was paved in 1968.  In 1988, the track was re-designed into its present D-shaped configuration

The name for the raceway complex was "Strawberry Hill" until the Virginia State Fairgrounds site was bought out in 1999 and renamed the "Richmond International Raceway".

Race report
The race was completed within two hours and forty-three minutes of the first official green flag of the race. Darrell Waltrip would end up defeating Bobby Allison (who drove a 1978 Ford Thunderbird) by only one second.

Neil Bonnett started chasing down Waltrip on pit road and slammed into Waltrip's vehicle; creating a rather brutal race ending battle and forcing Bill France Jr. to put them on probation for the remainder of the year. The spectators were incredibly disgruntled after Darrell Waltrip's victory so Waltrip needed police protection in order to make it to the post-race interviews.

The unliked bad boy driver (Waltrip) spins out the popular fan-favorite driver (Bonnett) who had dominated the race about to get a victory to end a winless streak.

Eighteen thousand people were a live witness to five yellow flags being used for twenty-seven laps in addition to 16 lead changes by the drivers. The pole position speed was acquired by Darrell Waltrip's Chevrolet Monte Carlo with a qualifying speed of  during his solo run. Meanwhile, the average speed of the actual race would be .

Dave Dion had his best start of fourth place and had a fast car in the race until an incident took him out of the race on lap 85. Roger Hamby matches his best Cup finish of tenth place.

Notable crew chiefs for this race included Darrell Bryant, Junie Donlavey, Buddy Parrott, Jake Elder, Kirk Shelmerdine, Dale Inman, Bud Moore, and Tim Brewer.

Ed Negre would receive the last-place finish for a brake problem acquired on lap 6 of the race. The top prize of the race was $13,800 ($ when adjusted for inflation) while last placed awarded the driver with a meager $300 ($ when adjusted for inflation). Cale Yarborough would retain his lead in the championship points after this race. 30 drivers would attend this race; all of them were born in the United States of America.

Qualifying

Top 10 finishers

Timeline
Section reference:
 Start of race: Darrell Waltrip started the race with the pole position.
 Lap 6: Ed Negre abused his vehicle's brakes, causing him to exit the race prematurely.
 Lap 16: Wayne Morgan's vehicle overheated, causing him to leave the race.
 Lap 28: Ferrel Harris' vehicle also overheated, with the same consequences.
 Lap 49: Tighe Scott had a terminal crash, causing him to withdraw from the event.
 Lap 52: Dave Marcis gained the lead from Darrell Waltrip.
 Lap 53: Lennie Pond gained the lead from Dave Marcis.
 Lap 54: Neil Bonnett gained the lead from Lennie Pond.
 Lap 85: The rear end of Dave Dion's vehicle was unserviceable, causing him to leave the race.
 Lap 172: Nelson Oswald's vehicle overheated, ending his day on the track early.
 Lap 182: Darrell Waltrip gained the lead from Neil Bonnett.
 Lap 183: Bobby Allison gained the lead from Darrell Waltrip.
 Lap 184: Darrell Waltrip gained the lead from Bobby Allison.
 Lap 191: Neil Bonnett took over the lead from Darrell Waltrip.
 Lap 198: Tommy Gale's engine became problematic, causing him not to finish the race.
 Lap 256: Frank Warren's vehicle had some handling issues, ending his race prematurely.
 Lap 265: Richard Petty took over the lead from Neil Bonnett.
 Lap 266: Bobby Allison took over the lead from Richard Petty.
 Lap 267: Neil Bonnett took over the lead from Bobby Allison.
 Lap 274: Richard Petty took over the lead from Neil Bonnett.
 Lap 286: Neil Bonnett took over the lead from Richard Petty.
 Lap 343: Bobby Allison took over the lead from Neil Bonnett.
 Lap 356: Issues with his vehicle's rear end would make Richard Petty humble, settling for a disrespectful 20th place "finish."
 Lap 385: Neil Bonnett took over the lead from Bobby Allison.
 Lap 395: Darrell Waltrip gained the lead from Neil Bonnett, making this the final lead change of the event.
 Finish: Darrell Waltrip won the race, shortly before disrespecting former race champion Neil Bonnett.

Championship standings

References

Capital City 400
Capital City 400
NASCAR races at Richmond Raceway